Noah S. "Soggy" Sweat Jr. (October 2, 1922February 23, 1996) was an American judge, law professor, and state representative in Mississippi, notable for his 1952 speech on the floor of the Mississippi state legislature concerning whiskey. Reportedly the speech took Sweat two and a half months to write. The speech is renowned for the grand rhetorical terms in which it seems to come down firmly and decisively on both sides of the question. The speech gave rise to the phrase if-by-whiskey, used to illustrate such equivocation in argument.

Career
Sweat was elected to the House in 1947, at the age of 24. He served only one five-year term, at the end of which he delivered his speech.

He subsequently pursued his career in law. Judge Sweat was the founder of the Mississippi Judicial College of the University of Mississippi Law Center. The writer John Grisham worked as his assistant as a law student in 1980.

According to William Safire, Sweat's nickname was derived from the phrase "sorghum top", a reference to the way in which his hair resembled a sugar cane tassel.

He died in 1996 in Alcorn County, Mississippi after a long battle with Parkinson's disease.

The "whiskey speech"
The "whiskey speech", delivered on Friday, April 4, 1952, concerned the question of the prohibition of alcoholic liquor, a law that was still in force in Mississippi at the time the speech was delivered.

Sweat later recalled, "When I finished the first half of the speech, there was a tremendous burst of applause. The second half of the speech, after the close of which, the wets all applauded. The drys were as unhappy with the second part of the speech as the wets were with the first half".

References

External links

Safire, William (1997)  Lend Me Your Ears: Great Speeches in History. New York: W. W. Norton & Company. . Page 876.

Members of the Mississippi House of Representatives
1922 births
1996 deaths
20th-century American politicians